Girona Futbol Club, S.A.D. is a professional football club based in Girona, Catalonia, Spain. Founded on 23 July 1930, it plays in La Liga, to which they gained promotion in the 2022 Segunda División play-offs.

Girona holds its home matches at the 11,810-capacity Estadi Montilivi and is known for its association with Catalan nationalism. The club also has youth and amateur women's teams for competition.

History
Football became of a particular interest in Girona at the beginning of the 20th century. The first major club in the city was Strong Esport (founded in 1902 under original name of FC Gerundense). In the 1920s in Girona there were two new clubs, CE Gironí and UD Girona. After the disappearance of the UD Girona it was decided to create a new football team in the city.

On 23 July 1930, in the café Norat in La Rambla of Girona, Girona Futbol Club was founded upon the dissolution of Unió Esportiva Girona for economic reasons. On 1 August 1930 the city council authorized the club so that it could use the city's emblem on its badges. It was achieved thanks to the efforts of enthusiasts led by the club's first president Albert de Quintana de León. The team subsequently entered in the second division of the Catalan Championships. Its first official match was against Colònia Artigas with the lineup: Florenza, Teixidor, Farró, Flavià, Comas, Corradi, Ferrer, Escuder, Clara, Torrellas and Taradellas.

1935–36 was the first season Girona played in Segunda División, and the club finished in top position in its group, subsequently appearing in the playoff stage against Celta de Vigo, Real Zaragoza, Arenas Club, Real Murcia and Xerez, but finishing second from bottom, thus out of the La Liga promotion zone.

After the Spanish Civil War, the club fluctuated between the second level and Tercera División, falling into the latter category in 1959 and being further demoted in 1980 – Segunda División B was created as the new division three in 1977, and the club lasted three years in the competition. In 1968, construction of the Estadi Montilivi began, with home matches being held there on a permanent basis from 1970 onwards after nearly five decades at the Vista Alegre stadium.

In the following decades, Girona alternated between the third and the fourth divisions, even spending three seasons in the regional championships, in 1982–83 and 1997–99. On 16 June 2008, after defeating Ceuta 1–0 in the play-offs, the Raül Agné-led side achieved a second consecutive promotion, returning to the second tier after a 49-year absence.

On 22 July 2010, a group of local businessmen led by Ramon Vilaró, Joaquim Boadas and Josep Slim purchased 72% of the club's shares, previously held by former club president Josep Gusó and Josep Rofes, thus becoming the new owners of Girona. Vilaró was elected the new president while Agné, after a spell with Recreativo de Huelva, returned as manager for the upcoming second division campaign, lasting in the position until 14 January 2012 when he was sacked following a 0–3 loss at Recreativo.

In 2011, Girona created a reserve team, having previously grown a natural grass pitch in Palau. On 9 May 2013, the club's board of directors, under the slogan "El Girona FC també és meu" ("Girona FC is mine too"), approved an increase of the club's capital in €300,000 to be distributed in €10 shares, aiming to balance its estate.

On the last matchday of the 2014–15 season, Girona needed to beat Lugo at home to earn promotion to La Liga, but were denied by a last-minute goal by the visitors. Girona had to settle for a play-off place, but were eliminated in the semi-finals by Real Zaragoza, despite winning the first leg 3–0. The next season, they reached the play-off final but were defeated by Osasuna. Girona finally earned promotion to La Liga after the 2016–17 season as they finished runners-up to Levante.  This was the first time that Girona had ever been promoted to La Liga in their 87-year history.

On 23 August 2017, it was announced City Football Group (CFG) had purchased 44.3% ownership in Girona. Another 44.3% was held by Girona Football Group, led by Pere Guardiola, the brother of CFG-owned Manchester City manager Pep Guardiola. On 29 October 2017, Girona recorded a memorable victory defeating reigning European Cup winners Real Madrid 2–1.

In July 2018 it was announced that Girona FC would be participating in their first ever Pre-Season international tournament held in India by Nippon Toyota. Girona FC faced the Indian team Kerala Blasters and the Australian Team Melbourne City FC.

On the last match day of the 2018–19 La Liga season, Girona were relegated to Segunda Division, ending their two-year spell in the Spanish top tier.

Training centre
The club's new training facilities are under construction since December 2017, located at the PGA Catalunya Golf Course complex to the south of Girona. It will be home to a  training pitch of hybrid grass as well as a  pitch of natural grass, in addition to indoor training facilities.

Season to season

3 seasons in La Liga
24 seasons in Segunda División
13 seasons in Segunda División B
44 seasons in Tercera División
3 seasons in Categorías Regionales

Players

First team squad

Reserve team

Out on loan

Club officials

Current technical staff

Board of directors 
{| class="wikitable"
|-
!Office
!Name
|-
| President
| Delfí Geli
|-
| Board president
| Pere Guardiola
|-
| Vice president
| Diego Gigliani
|-
|rowspan=4| Board members
| Marcelo Claure
|-
| John MacBeath
|-
| Roger Solé
|-
| Simon Cliff
|-
| CEO
| Ignacio Mas-Bagà

Coaches

 Francisco Bru (1937–39)
 Károly Plattkó (1948–49)
 Hilario (1949–50)
 Domènec Balmanya (1952)
 Emilio Aldecoa (1955–57), (1959–60)
 Dagoberto Moll (1965–66)
 Emilio Aldecoa (1967–68)
 Vicenç Sasot (1972–74)
 Emilio Aldecoa (1974–76)
 Lluís Coll (1976)
 Vicenç Sasot (1979–80)
 Pepe Pinto (1980–81), (1981–82)
 Luis Costa (1981–82)
 Emilio Aldecoa (1982)
 Antonio Lagunas (1987)
 Alfonso Muñoz Jaso (1987–88), (1993–95)
 José Manuel (1988)
 Paco Bonachera (1993)
 Pere Gratacós (1997–99)
 Narcís Julià (2003)
 Agustín Abadía (2003–04)
 Josep María Nogués (2005)
 Joan Carrillo (2006–07)
 Ricardo Rodríguez (2007)
 Raül Agné (2007–09)
 Javi Salamero (2009)
 Miquel Olmo (2009)
 Cristóbal Parralo (2009)
 Narcís Julià (2009–10)
 Raül Agné (2010–12)
 Josu Uribe (2012)
 Javi Salamero (2012)
 Rubi (2012–13)
 Ricardo Rodríguez (2013)
 Javi López (2013–14)
 Pablo Machín (2014–18)
 Eusebio Sacristán (2018–19)
 Juan Carlos Unzué (2019)
 José Luis Martí (2019–20)
 Francisco (2020–21)
 Míchel (2021–)

Honours

National
Segunda Division B
Winners (1): 2007–08

Tercera Division
Winners (5): 1933–34, 1947–48, 1954–55, 1988–89, 2005–06

Regional titles
Supercopa de Catalunya
Winners (1):  2019

See also
CF Peralada-Girona B
Girona FC B
CF Riudellots

References

External links
Official website 
BDFutbol team profile

 
Girona FC
Association football clubs established in 1930
Sport in Girona
1930 establishments in Spain
La Liga clubs